Outsider(s) may refer to:

Film
 Outsider (1997 film), a 1997 Slovene-language film
 Outsider (2012 film), a Malayalam-language Indian film
 Outsiders (1980 film), a South Korean film featuring Won Mi-kyung

Literature
 Outsider (Known Space), a fictional species in Larry Niven's Known Space universe
 Outsider (comics), a character in various DC Comics storylines
 Outsiders (comics), a team of freakish superheroes published by DC Comics 
Young Justice: Outsiders, a TV series featuring the team
 a fictional species of magical creatures in Jim Butcher's The Dresden Files novels; see Cold Days
 Outsiders, a book by American sociologist Howard S. Becker
 Outsider, a pseudonym used by Aarne Haapakoski

Music
 Outsider music, a category of music independent of the music industry
 Outsider (rapper), a South Korean speed rapper

Albums
 Outsider (Three Days Grace album), 2018
 Outsider (Uriah Heep album), 2014
 Outsider (Comeback Kid album), 2017
 Outsider (Roger Taylor album), 2021
 Outsider, 2007 album by the Restarts
 Outsiders (album), a 2017 album by British punk rock band Gnarwolves

Songs
 "Outsiders" (Franz Ferdinand song)
 "Outsiders" (Suede song)
 "Outsider" (Cliff Richard song), a song written by Roy C. Bennett and Sid Tepper and recorded by Cliff Richard
 "Outsider", by Chumbawamba from Tubthumper
 "Outsider", by Jessie Malakouti
 "Outsider", by Juliana Hatfield from Only Everything
 "Outsider", by Ramones from Subterranean Jungle

Television
 "Outsider" (Law & Order: Special Victims Unit), an episode of Law & Order: Special Victims Unit
 "Outsiders" (The Unit), an episode of The Unit
 Outsiders (American TV series), a drama series aired on WGN America
 Outsiders (Australian TV program), an Australian news commentary program on Sky News Live
 Outsiders (British TV series), a British outdoor-themed panel show

Other uses
 Outsider (painting), a 1988 painting by Australian artist Gordon Bennett
 Outsider (Dungeons & Dragons), a creature (type) in the role-playing game Dungeons & Dragons
 In the emic and etic perspectives in ethnography and social science, the outsider or etic approach

See also
 The Outsider (disambiguation)
 The Outsiders (disambiguation)
 Outside (disambiguation)
 Outsider art, created by artists working outside the mainstream art world